Spartocentrum is a genus of air-breathing land snails, a terrestrial pulmonate gastropod mollusks in the subfamily Bulimulinae of the family Bulimulidae.

Species
 Spartocentrum digueti (Mabille, 1895)
 Spartocentrum eisenianum (Pilsbry, 1900)
 Spartocentrum insulare (Hanna, 1923)
 Spartocentrum irregularis (Gabb, 1868)
 Spartocentrum vanduzeei (Hanna, 1923)

References

 Bank, R. A. (2017). Classification of the Recent terrestrial Gastropoda of the World. Last update: July 16th, 2017.

External links
  Dall, W. H. (1895). Synopsis of the subdivisions of Holospira and some related genera. Nautilus. 9(5): 50-51

Bulimulidae